The Albin Vega, also called the Vega 27, is a Swedish sailboat that was designed by Per Brohäll as cruiser and first built in 1965.

The design was developed into the longer Singoalla 34 in 1970.

Production
The design was built by Albin Marine in Sweden from 1965 until 1979, with about 3,450 boats completed, but it is now out of production. The Vega 27 is probably the most produced Scandinavian keelboat.

Design

The Vega is a recreational keelboat, built predominantly of fibreglass, with wood trim. It has a masthead sloop rig with aluminum spars, a deck-stepped mast, wire standing rigging and a single set of unswept spreaders. The hull has a slightly reverse sheer line, a spooned raked stem, an angled transom, a keel-mounted rudder controlled by a tiller and a fixed modified long keel, with a cutaway forefoot. It displaces  and carries  of cast iron ballast.

The design has sleeping accommodation for four people, with a double "V"-berth in the bow cabin and two straight settees in the main cabin. The galley is located on both sides of the companionway ladder, with the two-burner stove to port and the sink to starboard. A navigation station is on the starboard side. The head is located just aft of the bow cabin on the starboard side.

Operational history
The boat is supported by an active class club in the United Kingdom, that organizes racing events, the Vega Association of Great Britain.

The Vega has been cruised around the world on many occasions, including by Jarle Andhøy and his crew, in Berserk, to Antarctica and to the north of Spitsbergen.

A 36-year-old Albin Vega sailboat, named St. Brendan in honour of the 6th-century Irish explorer monk St. Brendan, was used by Matt Rutherford of Annapolis, Maryland in his successful 314-day,  solo circumnavigation of North and South America which was officially completed on 18 April 2012, when Rutherford crossed his start and finish line—the Chesapeake Bay Bridge-Tunnel outside Norfolk, Virginia.

A review in Good Old Boat magazine by John Vigor stated, "Brohäll set out to design a boat that was light, fast, roomy, seaworthy, and relatively cheap. This was a seemingly impossible task because sailboat performance is the distilled essence of a series of compromises. What is seaworthy, for example, is not usually fast. What is roomy is not necessarily cheap. But Brohäll succeeded in producing one of those rare designs that exceeds most people's expectations in most areas. The one obvious thing the Vega lacks, in comparison with more modern designs, is space down below."

A review in Blue Water Boats concluded, "By all accounts the Vega under sail handles easily and is a well balanced creature with no weather helm. Despite her shallow draft she is reported to point well to windward and while tender initially up to around 10 to 15 degrees of heel she carries full sail easily up to 20 knots. She's a fast boat downwind but offshore cruisers would do well to carry a large spinnaker or drifter for light airs."

See also
List of sailing boat types

Related development
Singoalla 34

References

Further reading
 Log of the Mahina by John Neal. A book following the voyages of Neal aboard the Albin Vega Mahina 
 Berserk: My Voyage to the Antarctic in a Twenty-Seven-Foot Sailboat by David Mercy

External links

Keelboats
Dinghies
1960s sailboat type designs
Sailing yachts
Sailboat type designs by Per Brohäll
Sailboat types built by Albin Marine